The 1944 United States presidential election in Iowa took place on November 7, 1944, as part of the 1944 United States presidential election. Iowa voters chose ten representatives, or electors, to the Electoral College, who voted for president and vice president.

Iowa was won by Governor Thomas E. Dewey (R–New York), running with Governor John Bricker, with 51.99% of the popular vote, against incumbent President Franklin D. Roosevelt (D–New York), running with Senator Harry S. Truman, with 47.49% of the popular vote. This is the last election in which an incumbent president of either party won another term in office without winning the Hawkeye state.

Results

Results by county

See also
 United States presidential elections in Iowa

References

Iowa
1944
1944 Iowa elections